A prince consort is the husband of a monarch who is not a monarch in his own right. In recognition of his status, a prince consort may be given a formal title, such as prince. Some monarchies use the title of king consort for the same role.

Usage in Europe

United Kingdom 
In the United Kingdom, the title "Prince Consort" is unique to Prince Albert, although the term applies as a description to other British princes consort. The title was awarded to him in 1857 by his wife, Queen Victoria. Before Prince Albert, there had only been five English, Scottish, or British male consorts, being the husbands of Mary I of England, Queen Anne, and Mary, Queen of Scots, the last of whom was married three times during her long reign. The remaining queens regnant before Victoria sidestepped the question of the proper title for a male consort, Elizabeth I having died without marrying, and Mary II's husband William III having been explicitly made king in his own right. 

The titles of the five pre-Victorian male consorts varied widely. Mary I of England's husband Philip was declared king jure uxoris and given powers equal to his wife while she reigned, but Queen Anne's husband Prince George of Denmark received no British titles other than the Dukedom of Cumberland (his princely title being Danish). Meanwhile, the official title of the three husbands of Mary, Queen of Scots was never fully resolved. At least one (Henry Stuart, Lord Darnley), was declared king consort, and both he and his predecessor Francis II of France sought recognition as king jure uxoris (under a proffered theory of the "Crown Matrimonial of Scotland"), but the title and powers of the consort were a constant issue during Mary's reign and remained unresolved when Mary was captured and executed.

The only male consort since Prince Albert's death, Prince Philip, Duke of Edinburgh, the consort of Elizabeth II, was made a peer in advance of his marriage to then-Princess Elizabeth in 1947. After Elizabeth's accession in 1952, there was debate in royal circles and among senior politicians (both in Britain and in other Commonwealth Realms, particularly Canada) about her husband's proper title. Some leaders, including the Prime Minister of the day, Sir Winston Churchill, suggested reviving Prince Albert's title of "Prince Consort". Others put forward other styles, including "Prince of the Realm" and "Prince of the Commonwealth" (the latter of which was suggested by John Diefenbaker, at the time a member of the Canadian Opposition front bench). In 1957, Elizabeth created Philip a prince of the United Kingdom of Great Britain and Northern Ireland, the same title borne by sons of the sovereign.

The distinction between the positions of prince consort and king is important in the British patriarchal hierarchical system. Within this hierarchy, the king holds a higher position in the British social hierarchy than any other, and so more power is attributed to him. In cases where the hereditary monarch is female, such as Queen Victoria, who ascended to the throne in 1837, power is attributed to the queen, for she holds the highest position in the absence of a king.

Other countries 
Jacques I was the prince consort of Monaco in 1731 while married to the ruling princess, Louise Hippolyte.

In 2005, Prince Henrik, the spouse of Margrethe II of Denmark, was awarded the title. In 2016, he announced that upon his retirement, he would revert to the title of prince that he had received at their marriage in 1967.

Usage in Asia

Imperial China
The imperial Chinese title of fuma, and its Manchu equivalent e'fu, are sometimes translated as "prince consort". This was originally an office of the imperial household, later evolving into the title reserved for husbands of imperial princesses. These princes consort could hold other offices and titles in their own right.

Burma
Princes and princesses consort are called "Myauk Thar Daw". Burmese: မြောက်သားတော်). Because the consorts live in "North House". This word mean:
"North" for Myauk.
House for Ain Thar Daw

King consort
A king consort or emperor consort is a rarely used (or disputed) title to describe the husband of a queen regnant. Examples include:
Mary, Queen of Scots (reigned 1542–1567) was first married to Francis, Dauphin of France (later Francis II of France), who became king consort of Scotland upon their marriage. She then married Henry Stuart, Lord Darnley, the eldest son of the Earl and Countess of Lennox in July 1565. Darnley was a great-grandson of King Henry VII of England and Mary's first cousin, and he was considered to have a strong claim to the Scottish throne. On the evening before their marriage, Mary proclaimed Darnley "King of Scots", a title that she could not legally grant him without the consent of Parliament, but which was never formally challenged. However, this title did not grant him any automatic right of rule or of succession to the throne should Mary die. For that to happen, it was necessary that Mary grant him the Crown Matrimonial of Scotland, which never happened.
Mary I of England (reigned 1553–1558) married Prince Philip (later Philip II of Spain) in 1554. Under the terms of Queen Mary's Marriage Act, Philip was to be styled "King of England", all official documents (including Acts of Parliament) were to be dated with both their names, and Parliament was to be called under the joint authority of the couple, for the duration of the marriage only.
After Queen Maria II of Portugal (reigned 1826–1828, 1834–1853) gave birth to her first son in 1837, her husband – Prince Ferdinand of Saxe-Coburg and Gotha – was made king consort in accordance with the article 90 of the Portuguese Constitutional Charter, as Ferdinand II of Portugal. He retained the style and title of king even after the death of Mary II and her succession by their children Peter V and then Louis I.
When the reigning Isabella II (reigned 1833–1868) married Francis, Duke of Cádiz, he became king consort of Spain. Like his wife, he retained the style and title of king even after her abdication in favour of their son, Alfonso XII.
Queen Victoria (reigned 1837–1901) wanted to make her husband Albert of Saxe-Coburg and Gotha "king consort"  but the British government refused to introduce a bill allowing it, as Albert was a foreigner. She instead gave him the title of prince consort in 1857.

See also
 Consort crown
 Jure uxoris
 Princess consort
 Queen consort
 List of British consorts
 :Category:Kings consort

References

 
Titles
 Royal consorts
-